Kushagra Rawat (born 16 February 2000) is an Indian swimmer. He competed in the men's 400 metre freestyle at the 2019 World Aquatics Championships and he did not qualify to compete in the final.

At the 2022 Commonwealth Games, held in the summer in Birmingham, England, Rawat placed fourteenth in the 400 metre freestyle with a time of 3:57.45. In the 200 metre freestyle the following day, he placed eighth in heat three, and 25th overall, with a time of 1:54.56. Three days later, he ranked eighth in the preliminaries of the 1500 metre freestyle with a time of 15:47.77 and qualified for the final. He placed eighth in the final, finishing in a time of 15:42.67.

References

External links
 

2000 births
Living people
Indian male freestyle swimmers
Place of birth missing (living people)
Swimmers at the 2022 Commonwealth Games
Commonwealth Games competitors for India
Competitors at the 2019 Summer Universiade
South Asian Games medalists in swimming
South Asian Games gold medalists for India
South Asian Games silver medalists for India